Gobiosoma is a genus of gobies native to fresh, brackish and marine waters of the Americas.

Species
Several additional species were formerly included in this Gobiosoma, but these have been moved to Elacatinus and Tigrigobius. There are currently 19 recognized species in Gobiosoma, but Gobiosoma pallida is a species inquirenda:
 Gobiosoma aceras (Ginsburg, 1939) (White-margined goby)  
 Gobiosoma alfiei J. C. Joyeux & Macieira, 2015 (Alfie's goby) 
 Gobiosoma bosc (Lacépède, 1800) (Naked goby)
 Gobiosoma chiquita (O. P. Jenkins & Evermann, 1889) (Sonora goby)
 Gobiosoma ginsburgi Hildebrand & Schroeder, 1928 (Seaboard goby)
 Gobiosoma grosvenori (C. R. Robins, 1964) (Rock-cut goby)
 Gobiosoma hemigymnum (C. H. Eigenmann & R. S. Eigenmann, 1888) (Half-naked goby) 
 Gobiosoma hildebrandi (Ginsburg, 1939)
 Gobiosoma homochroma (Ginsburg, 1939)
 Gobiosoma longipala Ginsburg, 1933 (Two-scale goby)
 Gobiosoma nudum (Meek & Hildebrand, 1928) (Knob-chin goby)
 Gobiosoma pallida Herre, 1934 
 Gobiosoma paradoxum (Günther, 1861) (Paradox goby)
 Gobiosoma robustum Ginsburg, 1933 (Code goby)
 Gobiosoma schultzi (Ginsburg, 1944)
 Gobiosoma seminudum (Günther, 1861) (Silt goby) 
 Gobiosoma spes (Ginsburg, 1939) (Vermiculated goby)
 Gobiosoma spilotum (Ginsburg, 1939) (Isthmian goby)
 Gobiosoma yucatanum C. E. Dawson, 1971 (Yucatán goby)

References

 
Gobiidae
Ray-finned fish genera
Taxa named by Charles Frédéric Girard